West Grove is an unincorporated community in western Davis County, Iowa, United States.  It lies along Iowa Highway 2 west of the city of Bloomfield, the county seat of Davis County.  Its elevation is 942 feet (287 m).

West Grove's post office was established as the Weeping Willow post office on 21 June 1852 before being changed to West Grove on 19 February 1856.  It was discontinued on 31 August 1959 and attached to the Bloomfield post office.  Although its post office is gone, West Grove has its own ZIP Code, 52537, even though the ZIP Code system was not implemented until several years after West Grove's post office was attached to Bloomfield's.

West Grove was laid out as a town in 1853.

References

Unincorporated communities in Davis County, Iowa
Unincorporated communities in Iowa